IT Valley, formerly known as Silicon Valley of Turkey (Turkish: Türkiye'nin Silikon Vadisi) was a proposed project of Turkish architect Günay Erdem and Turkish landscape architect Sunay Erdem for the Turkish version of the Silicon Valley at San Francisco, United States.

Concept and design 
Erdem used cosmos and technology concepts together with traditional Turkish values at design development process. Cosmos reflects as symbolic radial grid of the Solar System and planetary forms to the buildings. Technology reflects as digital grid in organization schema of design. Traditional Turkish value star and crescent emerges in the whole Silicon Valley City.

Quick facts 
 Total Plot Area: 1,800,000 m2
 Total Buildings Area: 900,000 m2
 Buildings: Administrative, Research & Development Centers (small, medium and large scaled), City Center (Mall, Restaurants, Cinemas etc.), Congress & Convention Center, Hotel, Housing, Sports Center, Schools (Elementary & High), Health Center, Mosque
 Marina
 Valley
 Park
 Circulations: Traffic, Cycle Lane, Light Rail Road
 Accesses: Ankara Istanbul Highway, Marmara Sea, North, South
 Project Cost: $400 million

External links 

 Official web site
 Erdem Architects official Facebook page 
 Gunay Erdem-Arkitera
 Turkish architects entrusted the future of New York
 Architects Of Future
 Turkish architects design peace islands to replace La Spezia war arsenal
 Erdem Architects Gets First Prize in La Spezia Arsenale 2062 Competition
 Identify a Public Space

References 

Gebze
Buildings and structures in Kocaeli Province